Juan de Aragüés (c. 1710 – 28 May 1793) was a Spanish composer. By 1754 he was professor of music at the University of Salamanca.

References

1710s births
1793 deaths
Spanish Classical-period composers
18th-century classical composers
18th-century male musicians
18th-century musicians
Spanish male classical composers
Academic staff of the University of Salamanca